Luv Is Rage 1.5 is the second extended play by American rapper Lil Uzi Vert. It was independently released on February 26, 2017 via Uzi's SoundCloud as throwaway tracks from their debut album Luv Is Rage 2 (2017). The project includes four tracks – including the single "XO Tour Llif3" which was included later on Luv Is Rage 2 – and features production from Derelle Rideout, DJ Plugg, DP Beats, JW Lucas and TM88.

Background
The four-track project was uploaded exclusively to Lil Uzi Vert's SoundCloud account, with the intention of generating excitement for their following release, Luv Is Rage 2. The EP quickly amassed millions of plays despite not having a commercial release. Most notably the song "XO Tour Llif3" gained significant online attention, resulting in its commercial release as a single and later its inclusion on Luv Is Rage 2.

Singles
On March 24, 2017, Lil Uzi Vert released "XO Tour Llif3" to streaming services as a single and in May 2017 peaked at number 7 on the US Billboard Hot 100.

Track listing
Track listing is in order of upload date on SoundCloud, as no track order was officially released.

Sample credits
 "Boring Shit" contains uncredited samples of theme music of Reading Rainbow, written by Stephen Horelick, Dennis Neil Kleinman, and Janet Weir, as a rendition for "PBS Kids Medley" by The James Finley Chorale

References

2017 mixtape albums
Atlantic Records albums
Lil Uzi Vert albums
Sequel albums